Kanbun is a Unicode block containing annotation characters used in Japanese copies (kanbun) of Classical Chinese texts, to indicate reading order.

Its block name in Unicode 1.0 was CJK Miscellaneous, and its code point range was defined differently, including the then-unallocated space now occupied by Bopomofo Extended, CJK Strokes and Katakana Phonetic Extensions.

History
The following Unicode-related document records the purpose and process of defining specific characters in the Kanbun block:

References 

Unicode blocks